Franklin Carpenter may refer to:

 Franklin B. Carpenter (1818–1862), American lumber merchant and politician
 Franklin Metcalfe Carpenter (1847–1907), farmer and political figure in Ontario, Canada
 Franklin R. Carpenter (1848–1910), mining specialist

See also
Frank Carpenter (disambiguation)